Kim Ju-Hwan (born 24 April 1982) is a South Korean football midfielder who last played for Daegu FC.

Club career 

Kim was drafted to Daegu FC from Ajou University in Suwon in 2005, and established himself as a regular in the Daegu FC senior men's squad.  For the 2010 season, Kim has joined Sangmu while he fulfills his compulsory two-year military service.

Club career statistics

External links 

1982 births
Living people
Association football midfielders
South Korean footballers
Daegu FC players
Gimcheon Sangmu FC players
K League 1 players